Ambatofinandrahana District is a district in central Madagascar. It is part of Amoron'i Mania Region. It coverts an area of 10,321.48 km2, and in 2013 its population was estimated at 155,470. Its capital is Ambatofinandrahana.

Communes
The district is further divided into nine communes:

 Ambatofinandrahana
 Ambatomifanongoa
 Ambondromisotra
 Amborompotsy
 Fenoarivo
 Itremo
 Mandrosonoro
 Mangataboahangy
 Soavina

Geography
This district is situated on the Route nationale 35 from Morondava to Ivato.

Nature
The protected area of the Massif d'Itremo.

Geology
The only quartzite and marble quarries of Madagascar are found within 40 km from Ambatofinandrahana and there are found 7 qualities:  green, pink, brown, cream, blue pastel, white and black.

References

Districts of Amoron'i Mania